Gobe Melke (Amharic: ጎቤ መልኬ) also known as Jawi and Wawa, was an Amhara freedom fighter and resistance leader who was born in 1947 in Tsegede, Begemder and was assassinated in 2017 by an ANDM agent who happened to be his close relative. Gobe Melke, 70, led a rebel group beginning in July 2016 when North Gonder was turned into a war zone after the Ethiopian government, run by the EPRDF, deployed the national army in the region to quell anti-government protests. He engaged in guerrilla warfare against the Tigrayan People's Liberation Front during which he killed numerous government forces, and took many prisoner before being wounded in the spring of 2017.

His resistance movement in Gonder was inspired by Ethiopia’s resistance against fascist Italy during Itaian East Africa and kicked off after peaceful demonstrations against the TPLF's forced annexation of ethnic  Amhara land west of the Tekeze River such as Wolkait were violently repressed by the government during the 2016–2018 Ethiopian state of emergency. 

Gobe Melke, in an exclusive interview with ESAT, revealed that his forces worked in tandem with Ginbot 7, an armed opposition group operating out of Eritrea, to inflict heavy losses on the EPRDF's forces in November of 2016. His rebel forces are also noted as being one of the earliest and most impactful  Fano militias.

References 

Date of birth missing
Assassinated Ethiopian people

1947 births
2017 deaths